There are a wide range of frogs, salamanders and newts that can be kept in an aquarium.

Aquatic frogs 
African dwarf frog - Hymenochirus boettgeri or Hymenochirus curtipes
African clawed frog - Xenopus laevis
 Indonesian Floating Frog - Occidozyga lima
Western clawed frog - Xenopus tropicalis
Surinam toad - Pipa pipa

Newts 
Paddle-Tail Newt
Fire Belly Newt
Spotted Paddle-Tail Newt

Salamanders 
Mole salamander
Axolotl
Siren
Mudpuppy
Amphiuma
Hellbender (Cryptobranchus alleganiensis)
Giant salamander (Cryptobranchidae)

Caecilians
Cayenne caecilian
Rubber eel

References

freshwater
freshwater amphibian